Thomas Arthur Hickey (20 December 1901 – 14 September 1935) was an Australian rules footballer who played with Fitzroy in the Victorian Football League (VFL).

Notes

External links 

1901 births
1935 deaths
Australian rules footballers from Melbourne
Fitzroy Football Club players
People from Carlton, Victoria